Detective Brett Mahoney is a fictional character appearing in American comic books published by Marvel Comics. He is a strictly loyal police detective who finds himself involved in the activities of superhumans.

He was portrayed by Royce Johnson in the Marvel Cinematic Universe series Daredevil, an episode of Jessica Jones, and both seasons of The Punisher.

Publication history
The character, created by Marc Guggenheim and Dave Wilkins, first appeared in Marvel Comics Presents vol. 2 #1 (Nov. 2007).

Fictional character biography
Brett Mahoney is the partner of Stacy Dolan. In his first appearance they were investigating the death of a John Doe. The only clue they had was from a witness who described an unusual being later identified by Reed Richards as Uatu the Watcher. After learning that the John Doe is an extraterrestrial and that deceased spy Yelena Belova are somehow involved, Mahoney and Dolan later discover that the crime is related to a Muslim named Jaafar Yoosuf who Dolan arrested earlier for "buying" superpowers. They break into Yoosuf's apartment, but he is absent. When Dolan is accused of killing the John Doe, as evidenced by security footage showing her committing the crime, Mahoney simply tells her to remain silent as he is aware that something is wrong. Mahoney is visited by an escaped Dolan who fakes her death and leaves a book for him to read telling him the truth about what happened.

Mahoney is hired by Old Man Logan and Storm to examine the body of a dead mutant. He concludes that he was killed by a special bullet and that other mutants were killed the same way. Afterwards, Mahoney and the NYPD arrest the culprit X-Cutioner.

In other media
Brett Mahoney is a recurring character in the Marvel Cinematic Universe's Netflix shows, where he is portrayed by Royce Johnson.
 Brett makes his debut in season 1 of Daredevil. He is a Sergeant at the 15th Precinct, and has had a friendly rivalry with Foggy Nelson since they were four. Foggy regularly bribes Brett into giving Nelson & Murdock client referrals by giving him cigars for his mother Bess. However, he is not above sympathy, as he summons Matt, Karen and Foggy to the morgue to identify Elena Cardenas' body after Fisk has her killed. After Detective Christian Blake is shot on Fisk's orders, Brett is assigned to stand guard outside Blake's hospital room and is present when Blake's partner Carl Hoffman is blackmailed by Fisk into poisoning Blake to keep him from talking. After Fisk kills Ben Urich, Matt and Foggy turn to Brett for assistance in taking down Fisk, as he is one of the few cops in the precinct not on Fisk's payroll. Matt tracks down and saves Hoffman just as he is about to be killed by Fisk's cops, and has him turn himself over to Brett to be booked into custody. Following Fisk's attempt to escape while being escorted to jail, Brett is responsible for recapturing Fisk and taking him back into custody. 
 Brett makes a cameo appearance in season 1 of Jessica Jones, when Kilgrave walks into the 15th precinct and orders the cops to all point guns at each other or themselves. Brett in particular is forced to point his gun at Oscar Clemons' head.
 Brett has an expanded role in season 2 of Daredevil. He is first introduced when Matt and Foggy encounter him at the scene of a Kitchen Irish massacre committed by Frank Castle and give him information on Grotto. Brett cautions Matt and Foggy to turn over Grotto to the NYPD and walk away so they aren't caught in the crossfire. Brett later guards Grotto after Castle tries to kill him and Karen at the hospital. Later on, in "Penny and Dime," Brett rolls up on Matt after he rescues Frank from the Kitchen Irish, and almost arrests Matt until Matt persuades him to take the credit for Frank's arrest to bolster public confidence in the NYPD. The publicity of the arrest earns Brett a transfer to the Detective Bureau, much to Matt, Karen and Foggy's surprise when they find Brett has been placed in charge of the security detail guarding Frank while he recovers in the hospital before his arraignment. A few episodes later, when Matt discovers that the Hand are harvesting human blood, he seeks out Brett and shows him the blood farm. Brett puts Karen under police protection when her investigation into Frank's background leads her to be targeted by the Blacksmith, the man responsible for the death of Frank's family. She slips out of protective custody, but after witnessing Frank brutally kill two of the Blacksmith's men at a diner, Karen returns to give Brett information about where the heroin is being transferred. In the season 2 finale, members of the Hand working for Nobu rough up Brett and force him to give them files on people saved by Daredevil, among them Karen and Turk Barrett, so they can kidnap them as bait.
 Brett makes a cameo appearance in season 1 of The Punisher during the episode "Virtue of the Vicious", as he collects interviews from Karen, Dinah Madani, Billy Russo, and Senator Stan Ori over the events of Lewis Wilson's attempt to assassinate Karen and Senator Ori as well as any information about Frank's presence. 
 In the third season of Daredevil, Foggy is encouraged by his girlfriend Marci Stahl to run for district attorney against Blake Tower to protest Fisk's release from prison. Knowing the NYPD still dislikes Fisk, he goes to a union hall where Brett and several other officers are congregating. Although Foggy is initially greeted with jeers, he is able to use Brett's support to convince the cops in attendance to throw their support behind his campaign. Later in the season, Dex attacks Matt's church on Fisk's orders in an attempt to kill Karen to avenge her murder of James Wesley. Brett is among the cops who handle the crime scene investigation. With Matt and Karen stuck in the church basement, Matt is forced to call on Foggy to get them out. With help from Ray Nadeem, Foggy and Brett agree to have Karen "arrested" so that she will not be killed by the corrupt FBI agents in Fisk's pocket. Brett later agrees to take in Nadeem's family after Fisk attempts to have them killed. He also provides Matt and Nadeem with a police escort to transport Nadeem to the courthouse so he can testify before a grand jury. Hitmen working for Fisk ambush the convoy and attempt to kill Nadeem, but he and Matt manage to fight off the assassins. After Nadeem is murdered by Dex on Vanessa's orders, Foggy realizes Matt is likely going to go after Fisk at his wedding with the intention of killing him, so pays Brett a visit to warn him. Brett provides additional security at the Presidential Hotel, who are there when Dex is provoked by Matt into attacking Fisk's wedding for the death of Julie Barnes. After Matt defeats Dex and Fisk, Brett and the officers under his command arrive to take Fisk back to prison. When Fisk asks to say goodbye to Vanessa, Brett refuses to grant him the courtesy.
 Brett has a recurring appearance in the second season of The Punisher, where he leads the NYPD's investigation into Billy Russo's escape from custody. Throughout the investigation, he has several run-ins with Madani, who is conducting her own investigation into Russo.

References

External links
 Brett Mahoney at the Marvel Wiki

Comics characters introduced in 2007
Characters created by Marc Guggenheim
Marvel Comics male characters
Marvel Comics police officers
Marvel Comics television characters
Fictional African-American people
Fictional New York City Police Department detectives
Fictional American police detectives